Dime Box Independent School District is a public school district based in the community of Dime Box, Texas (USA).  The district has one school Dime Box School that serves students in grades kindergarten through twelve.

In 2009, the school district was rated "academically acceptable" by the Texas Education Agency.

References

External links
Dime Box ISD

School districts in Lee County, Texas